Jarahorato (also: Dzharakhorato, Jaaraahorato, Jaarrahorrato) is a village in the northwestern Awdal region of Somaliland.

History

According to local folklore, it is named after a legendary King and Queen who ruled this land before the Somali conquest of this region. The King was known as Jara and his wife was known as Horato.

Demographics

The town is exclusively inhabited by the Mohamuud Nuur, one of the two sub divisions of Reer Nuur, a subclan of the Gadabuursi Dir clan.

I.M. Lewis (1982) states that the Reer Mohamuud Nuur began cultivating in Jarahorato as early as 1911:
"The Gadabuursi Reer Mahammad Nuur, for example, are said to have begun cultivating in 1911 at Jara Horoto to the east of the present town of Borama."

See also

References
Jaaraahorato

Notes

Populated places in Awdal